Rozzi is an Italian surname. Notable people with the surname include:

Antonio Rozzi (born 1994), Italian footballer
Mark Rozzi (born 1971), American politician
Ricardo Rozzi (born 1960), Chilean ecologist and philosopher

See also
Rozzi Crane (born 1991), American singer-songwriter
Rozzi, players of the Teatro dei Rozzi, Siena, founded 1531
Roslindale, a neighborhood of Boston, nicknamed Rozzi

Italian-language surnames